Promitheas Patras B.C. (Greek: Προμηθέας Πατρών K.A.E.) is a Greek professional basketball club that is based in Patras, Greece. The club currently competes in the Greek Basket League and the EuroCup. It is Patras' prominent basketball club.

The basketball club is the main part of the Greek multi-sports club A.S. Promitheas Patras. The club's full name can be rendered as either A.S.P. Promitheas B.C., or A.S. Promitheas Patras B.C. With the acronym "A.S." standing for "Athlitikos Syllogos" (meaning: Athletic Club / Sports Club, in Greek: Αθλητικός Σύλλογος).

The club is named after Prometheus, one of the most well-known Greek mythological Titans, and the flame representing the fire knowledge he gave to people is the club's emblem (logo). The club is owned by Dr. Evangelos Liolios, who is also the owner of the Greek coffee company, Coffee Island, and managed by Christos Milas.

History

Rise of the club
The parent athletic club of A.S. Promitheas Patras was founded in 1985. The men's basketball section of the club was started in the 1986–87 season. From 1986 to 2013, the club competed in the local and regional basketball leagues of Greece.

Promitheas competed in one of Greece's national categories for the first time, in the 2013–14 season, when the club played in the Greek C League (4th Division). In that season, the team won the 4th Division's 3rd Group, with a record of 21–3, and thus earned a league promotion to the next higher league level. Prometheus competed in the Greek B League (3rd Division) in the 2014–15 season. That season, they won the 3rd Division's 2nd Group, with a record of 24–2, and thus once again earned a league promotion.

2015–16 season
Promitheas Patras played in the Greek A2 League (2nd Division), during the 2015–16 season. They finished the season with a record of 24–14 (regular season & playoffs), and finished in 3rd place overall in the league. After the season, they were granted a league promotion to the first tier Greek League, for the following 2016–17 season.

In the 2015–16 edition of the Greek Cup, Promitheas made it to the Last 16 stage.

2016–17 season
Promitheas Patras played in the top-tier level Greek Basket League for the first time, in the 2016–17 season. They finished the season in 9th place in the league standings, with a record of 10–16. During that same season, the club also participated in the 2016–17 Greek Cup competition, in which they finished in 10th place, after defeating Trikala Aries and Doukas on the road, and then losing to Koroivos, on the road, in Amaliada.

2017–18 season
In the 2017–18 Greek Basket League season, the technical leadership of Promitheas Patras was taken over by the club's sports director Makis Giatras. Giatras was flanked by the team's assistant coaches Eleftheriadis, Douvas and Souflias, the team's trainer Lapsanis, and the team's manager Kostas Rakintzis. For that season, the team also renewed its contracts with players Gkikas, Geromichalos, Gravas, and Faye.

The club also signed several new players: Toutziarakis, Saloustros, Dimakos, Releford, Evans, Lypovyy, Milošević, Hall, Ellis, Murry, and Prather. They finished the season in 4th place overall in the league standings, with a record of 19–15 (regular season & playoffs). That same season, the team also participated in the 2017–18 Greek Cup competition, in which they again finished in 10th place, after beating Koroivos and Lavrio, but then losing to Kolossos Rodou.

2018–19 season
Promitheas Patras directly joined the last 16 stage of the 2018–19 Greek Cup competition, where they faced Aris Thessaloniki. They won that game in Patras, by a score of 86–65, and thus proceeded to the Greek Cup's Top 8 phase. At that phase, they came up against Panathinaikos Athens - the eventual winners of the Greek Cup, and were defeated by a score of 76–68.

After completing the 2018–19 Greek Basket League's regular season, Promitheas finished in 4th place in the league's regular season standings. In the league's playoff quarterfinals, Promitheas beat PAOK Thessaloniki twice (81–66 and 76–68), and they qualified to the league's semifinals. In a dramatic five game semifinals playoff series, Promitheas earned a memorable victory against AEK Athens, by beating them on their home court, in the series' final game (85–84 in O.T.). After winning the series 3–2, Promitheas became the first Greek provincial team to qualify to the league's finals, and also managed to make it to the Greek League's playoff finals, for the first time in the club's history. In the Greek League Finals, they played against Panathinaikos Athens, and lost the series 3–0.

Moreover, also in the 2018–19 season, Promitheas debuted in European-wide club competitions by participating in the European secondary level FIBA Champions League, and making it to the competition's Round of 16. The Italian club Virtus Bologna, the Turkish club Beşiktaş İstanbul, the Lithuanian club Neptūnas Klaipėda, the French club SIG Strasbourg, the Belgian club Oostende, the German club Medi Bayreuth and the Slovenian club Olimpija Ljubljana were drawn as the opponents of Promitheas for the Champions League's phase of 32. With a record of 8 wins and 6 losses, Promitheas finished in 4th place in the group standings, and booked a ticket to the competition's knockout phase of 16.

At the knockout phase of 16, Promitheas faced the Spanish club Iberostar Tenerife, and managed to grab a 69–57 win in the first phase of the two-legged playoff series. After losing the first game of the series by 12 points in Patras, the Spanish club had an admirable reaction in the next game, and prevailed over Promitheas by 22 points (79–57) in the second game, and thus won the series by an aggregate score of 136–126.

The most productive scorers for Promitheas Patras in the FIBA Champions League were Rion Brown (214 points in 14 games, 15.3 on average), Tony Meier (193 points in 16 games, 12.1 on average), Leonidas Kaselakis (109 points in 12 games, 9.1 on average), Nikos Gkikas (134 points in 15 games, 8.9 on average), Oleksandr Lypovyy (104 points in 14 games, 7.4 on average), and Michalis Tsairelis (109 points in 16 games, 6.8 on average). Overall, the team recorded 79.3 points, 32.9 rebounds, and 18.8 assists per game on average.

2019–20 season
Promitheas competed in the European secondary level EuroCup, for the first time in the EuroCup 2019–20 season. Promitheas is a Super Cup winner 2020, in the final won Peristeri BC.

Arenas and training facilities

Dimitris Tofalos Arena
Promitheas Patras previously played their home games at the 1,500 seat A.E.P. Indoor Hall. The club currently plays its home games at the Dimitris Tofalos Arena, an indoor sports arena that is located in the Proastio neighborhood of Patras. It is also known by its original official name, which is PEAK, which stands for Pampeloponnisiako Ethniko Athlitiko Kentro Patron. The arena has a seating capacity of 4,200 people for basketball games.

Kastellokampos Training Center
Promitheas Patras' training facility, the Kastellokampos Training Center, was opened to the club's athletes and fans in September 2018. It is located in the Patras suburb of Kastellokampos. It is considered to be one of the most modern and complete basketball training centers in Europe, and is also home to one of the top level basketball academies in Europe. It comprises an area of 2,500 square meters, and contains three basketball courts, a state-of-the-art fitness center, and an ergo-metrics laboratory (Promitheas Lab). The training center is also regularly used to host youth basketball competitions and cultural events.

Promitheas Patras Youth Development Program
Since the summer of 2014, Promitheas Patras has run a "Youth Development Program" of sports scholarships. The program's aim is to combine sports with education, and to help children with sports talent, physical and athletic skills, and a willingness to compete in sports, to be able to combine both sports and education; by using and maximizing their athletic capabilities, while at the same time, maintaining their school performance. It includes children who are at secondary school age, and that have special abilities in the sport of basketball.

For the club's youth academy athletes, diligence in their school lessons is a prerequisite. For those children, ASP Promitheas created the "NOUS" scholarship program. The program's scholarship includes full financial coverage of the expenses by the club's association for: the athlete's accommodations in Patras (in the hostel of Dim. & Lilis Stavropoulou, located in Kastellokampos, Patras, in air conditioned student dormitories), their daily nutritional needs, their transportation needs, their sports clothing, and their education. The club also covers the tuition fees of the youth athletes, at Panou Schools, in Nafpaktos, which is the region's top secondary level educational institution.

The Promitheas Youth Development Program has enjoyed multiple successes, having finished in 2nd place in the Panou Schools competition in Kavala, in 2016, in 3rd place in the 2017 Nicosia Schools competition, and in 1st place in the 2018 Archaia Olympia Schools competition, at the Panhellenic Lyceum Championships. In total, they have earned one gold medal, one silver medal, and one bronze medal, while competing against the Lyceums of all of Greece.

Season by season

Titles and honors

Domestic competitions
 Greek League
 Runners-up (1): 2018–19
 Greek Cup
 Runners-up (2): 2020, 2021
 Greek Super Cup
 Winners (1): 2020
 Runners-up (1): 2021
 Greek 3rd Division
 Winners (2nd Group) (1): 2014–15
 Greek 4th Division
 Winners (3rd Group) (1): 2013–14

International competitions
 EuroCup
 Quarter-finalists (1): 2019-20 (Season cancelled due to COVID-19 pandemic)

Roster

Depth chart

Notable players 

  Dimitris Agravanis
  Giannis Agravanis
  Giannis Athinaiou
  Giorgos Bogris
  Nikos Gkikas
  Dimitris Kaklamanakis
  Leonidas Kaselakis
  Dimitris Katsivelis
  Michalis Lountzis
  Vangelis Mantzaris
  Lefteris Mantzoukas
  Loukas Mavrokefalidis
  Vassilis Mouratos
  Nondas Papantoniou
  Nikos Rogkavopoulos
  Christos Saloustros
  Zisis Sarikopoulos
  Michalis Tsairelis
  Antreas Christodoulou
  Fahro Alihodžić
  Kee Kee Clark
  Oleksandr Lypovyy
  Milan Milošević
  Miroslav Todić
  Mihajlo Andrić
  Gian Clavell
  Delroy James
  Danny Agbelese
  Mouhammad Faye
  Chris Babb
  James Bell
  Rion Brown
  Octavius Ellis
  Chase Fieler
  Marcus Foster
  Diante Garrett
  Jerai Grant
  Jerian Grant
  Langston Hall
  Dario Hunt
  Lucky Jones
  Marvin Jones
  Tony Meier
  Ian Miller
  McKenzie Moore
  Toure' Murry
  Zamal Nixon
  Terell Parks 
  Casey Prather
  Kendrick Ray
  Gerald Robinson
  Joe Young

Head coaches

Ownership and management

Sponsors
Coffee Island

References

External links
Official website 
Eurobasket.com Team Page
EuroCup Team Profile
Basketball Champions League - Foresight - a closer look at Promitheas BC

 
1986 establishments in Greece
Basketball teams in Greece
Sport in Patras